After the Rehearsal is a television film, written and directed by Ingmar Bergman in 1984. The script contains numerous quotes from Strindberg's A Dream Play. The film was screened out of competition at the 1984 Cannes Film Festival.

Plot summary
Rational, exacting, and self-controlled theater director, Henrik Vogler, often stays after rehearsal to think and plan. On this day, Anna comes back, ostensibly looking for a bracelet. She is the lead in his new production of Strindberg's A Dream Play. She talks of her hatred for her mother (now dead), an alcoholic actress who was Vogler's star and lover. Vogler falls into a reverie, remembering a day Anna's mother, Rakel, late in life, came after rehearsal to beg him to come to her apartment. He awakes and Anna reveals the reason she has returned: she jolts him into an emotional response, rare for him, and the feelings of a young woman and an older man play out.

Cast
Erland Josephson – Henrik Vogler (older)
Ingrid Thulin – Rakel Egerman
Lena Olin – Anna Egerman (older)
Nadja Palmstjerna-Weiss – Anna Egerman (younger)
Bertil Guve – Henrik Vogler (younger)

(Tartan DVD release of this film erroneously lists "Liv Ullmann" as one of the three main stars.  Ullmann is not in this film)

Reception
After the Rehearsal received strongly positive reviews from critics, garnering a 91% approval rating on Rotten Tomatoes. Vincent Canby wrote that it "may well be another Bergman classic." Roger Ebert gave it a full four stars and argued that the work "consists of unadorned surfaces concealing fathomless depths." The film ranked 4th on Cahiers du Cinéma's Top 10 Films of the Year List in 1985.

References

External links

"After the Rehearsal": an interpretation at the Cinemaven blog.

1984 films
Films directed by Ingmar Bergman
Films with screenplays by Ingmar Bergman
1980s Swedish-language films
1984 drama films
Films shot in Sweden
Swedish drama films
1980s Swedish films